The S&P/NZX 50 Index is the main stock market index in New Zealand. It comprises the 50 biggest stocks by free-float market capitalisation trading on the New Zealand Stock Market (NZSX). The calculation of the free-float capitalisation excludes blocks of shares greater than 20% and blocks between 5% and 20% that are considered strategic.

The index was introduced as the NZSX 50 Index in March 2003 and replaced the NZSE 40 Index as the headline index. It was renamed the NZX 50 Index in late 2005. The NZSE 40 Capital Index replaced the Barclays index in 1992, although the Barclays index is still compiled by the NZX but not made widely available. In 2015, the index was renamed to S&P/NZX 50 Index reflecting a 'strategic partnership' between NZX and S&P Dow Jones Indices (S&P DJI). As part of the partnership, S&P DJI has assumed responsibility for calculating, publishing distributing all NZX indices.

Constituents

See also
 List of companies of New Zealand - includes older list of NZX 50 companies

References

External links
 S&P/NZX 50 Index at S&P Dow Jones Indices
 S&P/NZX Indices at NZX
 Bloomberg page for NZSE50FG:IND

New Zealand stock market indices
Lists of companies of New Zealand